GoFundMe is an American for-profit crowdfunding  platform that allows people to raise money for events ranging from life events such as celebrations and graduations to challenging circumstances like accidents and illnesses. From 2010 to the beginning of 2020, over $9 billion has been raised on the platform, with contributions from over 120 million donors.

Founded by Brad Damphousse and Andrew Ballester, the company is based in Redwood City, California, with offices in San Diego and Dublin, and operations in France, Spain, Germany, Italy and the United Kingdom.

History 
The company was founded in May 2010 by Brad Damphousse and Andrew Ballester. Both had previously founded Paygr, which is a website dedicated to allowing members to sell their services to the public. Damphousse and Ballester originally created the website under the name "CreateAFund" in 2008 but later changed the name to GoFundMe after making numerous upgrades to the features of the website. GoFundMe was founded in San Diego, California.

In March 2017, GoFundMe became the biggest crowdfunding platform, responsible for raising over $3 billion since its debut in 2010. The company receives over $140 million in donations per month and made 2016 $100 million in revenue. In June 2015, it was announced that Damphousse and Ballester had agreed to sell a majority stake in GoFundMe to Accel Partners and Technology Crossover Ventures. Damphousse and Ballester stepped down from the day-to-day oversight of the company. The deal valued GoFundMe at around $600 million. In January 2017, GoFundMe acquired CrowdRise. GoFundMe's CEO is Tim Cadogan. Ballester remains on the board of directors and holds an undisclosed stake in the company.

Business model 
During this process, members can describe their fundraising cause and the amount they hope to raise, and upload photos or video. Once the website is created, GoFundMe allows users to share their project with people through integrated social network links (Facebook, Twitter, etc.) and email. People can then donate to a user's cause through the website using a debit card or credit card and track the funding. Those who donate can also leave comments on the website. If the user receives no donations, then no charge is made. Payment processors collect 2.9% and $0.30 from each GoFundMe transaction.

GoFundMe is unique to crowdfunding in that the company is not an incentive-based crowdfunding website. Although it does allow projects that are meant to fund other projects for musicians, inventors, etc., the business model is set up to allow for donations to personal causes and life events such as medical bills. GoFundMe also has a special section dedicated solely to users who are trying to raise money to cover their tuition costs. A prominent tuition project helped a user raise $25,000 for an out-of-state tuition to a PhD program. A 2014 tuition project raised over $100,000 for a homeless highschool Valedictorian to attend college and help his family 

GoFundMe targets social media platforms to create awareness for campaigns, and encourages individual users to promote their fundraiser on social media throughout a campaign. According to a 2018 report by GoFundMe based on past campaign data, a donor sharing a campaign on social media results in $15 of donations on average, while any share of a campaign on social media, regardless of whether the user donated to the campaign, results in $13 of donations on average.

In 2015, GoFundMe announced that the site would no longer support legal defense funds on their platform, after the site suspended funding for the defense of Sweet Cakes by Melissa, a bakery that was fined for refusing to bake a cake for a same-sex wedding.  GoFundMe's terms and conditions allow for campaigns for certain kinds of legal defense.

In November 2017, GoFundMe announced that it will no longer charge a 5% fee per donation for US, Canada, and UK individual campaigns, and instead rely upon tips left by donors to support the website. The processing fee for online credit card payments will still apply to donations.

In June 2019, GoFundMe terminated a $3 million fund raising for an Australian rugby player, Israel Folau, to finance a court case to appeal his multi-million dollar dismissal. He had quoted 1 Corinthians 6:9–10 on social media, which was said to be homophobic. An alternative fundraising site was set up by the Australian Christian Lobby with the public donating $2 million in 24 hours.

In January 2022, GoFundMe refused to release the CA$5 million funds raised for Freedom Convoy 2022. A company spokesperson said they paused the campaign in order to give organizers time to plan the distribution of funds.

In May 2022, GoFundMe announced the acquisition of non-profit donation site Classy. It was announced that Classy will remain and operate as a wholly owned subsidiary of GoFundMe.

Notable projects

Medical fundraising 
GoFundMe has described itself as the "leader in online medical fundraising". One in three campaigns is intended to raise funds for medical costs, with about 250,000 campaigns for a total of $650 million in contributions each year. This is attributed, in part, to failures in the U.S. healthcare system in which GoFundMe is used to bridge the gap.

CEO Rob Solomon has commented on this, saying that "When we started in 2010, it wasn't purposefully set up and built to be a substitute for medical insurance. We weren't ever set up to be a health care company and we still are not. But over time, people have used GoFundMe for the most important issues they are faced with." He also added that the large medical fundraising is the result of severe problems in his country's healthcare system, saying "The system is terrible [...] there are people who are not getting relief from us or from the institutions that are supposed to be there. We shouldn't be the solution to a complex set of systemic problems."

Official George Floyd Memorial Fund 
After the murder of George Floyd, his brother Philonise Floyd established the fund "to cover funeral and burial expenses, mental and grief counseling, lodging and travel for all court proceedings, and to assist our family in the days to come as we continue to seek justice for George.  A portion of these funds will also go to the Estate of George Floyd for the benefit and care of his children and their educational fund." One week after the tragedy and only four days after the start of the fund, it had already raised $7 million, putting it in ranking as one of the most highly funded GoFundMe campaigns to date.

The $1K Project 
Created by entrepreneurs and investors Alex Iskold and Minda Brusse in response to the novel coronavirus pandemic, The $1K Project uses individual GoFundMe pages to match specific donors with specific families who have been adversely affected by the pandemic. Donors agree to contribute a minimum of $1,000 per month for three months, for a total of $3,000 per family. Small-dollar donors can make contributions that are pooled together and then matched to a family. In August 2020, Andrew Yang's Humanity Forward Foundation committed to matching donations, dollar-for-dollar, up to $1 million. As of mid-October 2020, more than 800 families had been fully funded.

Sweet Cakes By Melissa
In 2015, after the site suspended funding for the defense of Sweet Cakes by Melissa, a bakery that was fined for refusing to bake a cake for a same-sex wedding, GoFundMe announced that the site would no longer support legal defense funds on their platform.  GoFundMe's terms and conditions allow for campaigns for certain kinds of legal defense.

Help Chelsea Manning Pay Her Court Fines 
Created by Kelly Wright to raise money to help former intelligence analyst and whistleblower Chelsea Manning pay $256,000 in court fines levied against her after her refusal to testify to a grand jury about WikiLeaks founder Julian Assange. Nearly 7,000 contributions ranging from $5 to $10,000 were made within two days.

Charity fraud

MMS Defense Fund 
Nominally a legal defense fund for Louis Daniel Smith, who faced criminal charges in relation to him selling "MMS" (Miracle Mineral Supplement). On May 27, 2015, Smith was found guilty of fraud and other charges. On May 31, 2015, the mmsdefensefund was removed from GoFundMe (an archived copy is available).

Paying it Forward 
This fundraiser was created by Kate McClure, Mark D'Amico, and Johnny Bobbitt Jr. to swindle people. Their fictitious story was that Bobbitt, a homeless veteran, spent his last $20 to assist McClure on the highway when her car ran out of gasoline. Widely reported in the US and internationally, it exceeded its goal by 4000% but when they began publicly squabbling for the money, an investigation was launched and all three were arrested and charged with theft by deception. They pleaded guilty and were sentenced to one year and a day, five years and five-year special probation, respectively.

We The People Built the Wall! 
Created with the goal of building a wall as private citizens to inhibit "illegal" entry along the U.S.-Mexico border. The founder, Brian Kolfage started a nonprofit with the money, We Build The Wall, which has constructed sections of the wall. Currently most money raised on GoFundMe, but in August 2020, Kolfage was indicted, along with Steve Bannon and two other co-defendants, on federal charges of defrauding hundreds of thousands of "We Build the Wall" donors by diverting money that was raised to personal use. Federal prosecutors said that despite "repeatedly assuring donors" that Kolfage would not be paid, the defendants engaged in a scheme to divert $350,000 to Kolfage, "which he used to fund his lavish lifestyle." He was separately indicted in May 2021 on federal charges of defrauding the IRS and filing false tax returns.

For victims of mass shootings in the U.S.

Bucks for Bauman 
This project was created for Jeff Bauman after he lost both legs during the Boston Marathon bombing.

Celeste & Sydney Recovery Fund 
Celeste and Sydney Corcoran were both victims of the Boston Marathon bombing: Sydney suffered severe injuries as a result of being hit with shrapnel, and Celeste lost both legs below her knees. This campaign page was created for their ongoing rehabilitation.

Support Victims of Pulse Shooting 
This fundraiser was created by Equality Florida to help the victims of a nightclub shooting in Orlando, Florida. Over 90,000 people have contributed to this campaign. GoFundMe headquarters donated $100,000 and waived every transaction fee for this campaign.

Las Vegas Victims Fund 
This fundraiser was created to help the victims of a mass shooting from the Las Vegas Strip in Paradise, Nevada.

Stoneman Douglas Victims' Fund 
There are a number of fundraisers for individual victims of the February 14, 2018, Stoneman Douglas High School Shooting in Parkland, Florida to help survivors' recovery and to fund causes chosen by family members in honor of the deceased.

Canada convoy protest 
In January 2022, Prime Minister Justin Trudeau announced that truck drivers crossing into Canada would have to be fully vaccinated. In response, some truckers organized a convoy to Ottawa under the name Freedom Convoy 2022. A GoFundMe project was then created with the claim of raising money for fuel and food for the convoy. On February 4, 2022, GoFundMe announced the fundraiser had been removed from the platform for violating terms of service, specifically "violence and other unlawful activity". The company initially stated that $9 million in donations from the fundraiser would be redistributed to "credible and established charities" and would only be refunded upon application, subject to a two-week time limit. Following criticism, the company subsequently stated on Twitter that all donations would be refunded within 10 business days.

Anti-vaccine fundraisers 
In March 2019, GoFundMe banned fundraisers from anti-vaccine activists, including Stop Mandatory Vaccination founder Larry Cook, citing violations of their terms of service. Despite the ban, The Independent found that several anti-vaccine campaigns were still running on GoFundMe as of May 2019.

In December 2021, The Sunday Times reported that GoFundMe had enabled the donation of over €300,000 to anti-vaccine campaigns and challenges to vaccine certificates.

In January 2023, the British disinformation analysis organization Logically reported that GoFundMe had funneled over $330,000 in donations to fundraisers for injuries supposedly caused by the COVID-19 vaccine.

List of projects 
Unless otherwise stated, the following amounts are in US dollars. Days raised is the number of days between Date raised and As of.

References

External links 
 
 

Financial services companies established in 2010
Crowdfunding platforms of the United States
Companies based in San Diego
Companies based in Redwood City, California
Internet properties established in 2010
2010 establishments in California
American companies established in 2010